Igor Aleksandrovich Gavrilin (born 10 November 1972) is a Russian professional football coach and a former player. He is an assistant manager for FC Saturn Ramenskoye.

Honours
 Russian Premier League bronze: 1992, 1993.
 Russian Cup finalist: 2005 (played in the early stages of the 2004/05 tournament for FC Khimki).

External links
 

1972 births
People from Zhukovsky, Moscow Oblast
Living people
Soviet footballers
Russian footballers
FC Dynamo Moscow players
Russian Premier League players
Russian expatriate footballers
Expatriate footballers in Israel
FC Saturn Ramenskoye players
FC Shinnik Yaroslavl players
FC Salyut Belgorod players
FC Khimki players
Russian football managers
Association football midfielders
FC Lukhovitsy players
FC Znamya Truda Orekhovo-Zuyevo players
Sportspeople from Moscow Oblast